Ignas Darkintis (born 8 February 1989) is a Lithuanian rugby union player. He plays as a prop.

Darkintis played most of his career at the Lithuanian side of Vairas Siauliai. He moved to Enköping RC in Sweden, for the 2009 season, where he won a Swedish Championship. He later moved to Thanet Wanderers RUFC, in England, a team from the London 1 South, for the 2010/11 season. In the 2011/12 season he plays for Birmingham and Solihull, a team in the English National 1. He moved to Ordizia RE, in Spain, for the 2012/13 season.

He also plays for Lithuania, participating in the team that won the 2008–2010 European Nations Cup Third Division with a Grand Slam. This was part of a spell of 18 consecutive winning matches that lasted until the loss to Ukraine in the 2011 Rugby World Cup qualifyings.

References

External links
 Player profile

1989 births
Living people
Lithuanian rugby union players
Rugby union props
Lithuanian expatriate rugby union players
Expatriate rugby union players in England
Expatriate rugby union players in Spain
Expatriate rugby union players in Sweden
Lithuanian expatriate sportspeople in Sweden
Lithuanian expatriate sportspeople in Spain
Lithuanian expatriate sportspeople in England